Saim Polatkan (10 February 1908 – 8 June 1991) was a Turkish equestrian. He competed in three events at the 1936 Summer Olympics.

References

1908 births
1991 deaths
Turkish male equestrians
Olympic equestrians of Turkey
Equestrians at the 1936 Summer Olympics
Sportspeople from Malatya